Alex Diakun (born February 8, 1946) is a Canadian actor.

Diakun was born in Rycroft, Alberta. He began his schooling in Chilliwack, British Columbia and finished with a BFA from the University of Alberta. Diakun has been acting for over four decades. He has appeared in over 200 stage plays, and many television guest appearances. Credits include a blue-faced alien (Chief Technical Director Hohne) in the series Andromeda, The Outer Limits, and the feature film Valentine.

Filmography

Film

McCabe & Mrs. Miller (1971) – Townsperson #7
Firebird 2015 AD (1981) – Dolan
Blood Link (1982) – Mr. Adams
Hellogoodbye (1982)
Utilities (1983) – Lavallee
Dead Wrong (1983) – The Stranger
The Journey of Natty Gann (1985) – Station Master
Rainbow War (1985)
High Stakes (1986) – Valenta
Malone (1987) – Madrid
Friday the 13th Part VIII: Jason Takes Manhattan (1989) – Deck Hand
Run (1991) – Casino Maitre D' 
The Hitman (1991) – Armone
Knight Moves (1992) – Grandmaster Lutz
The Portrait (1992) – Fraser
Harmony Cats (1993) – Art Kale
Double, Double, Toil and Trouble (1993) – Doorman
Ernest Rides Again (1993) – Librarian
Crackerjack (1994) – Kraft
Exquisite Tenderness (1995) – County General Doctor
Gunfighter's Moon (1995) – Reverend Clinton
Crying Freeman (1995) – Antonio Rossi
Starlight (1996) – Pallas
Drive, She Said (1997) – The Prophecy
Wrongfully Accused (1998)
Hoods (1998) – Roman
The Proposal (2001) – Jimmy
Valentine (2001) – Pastor
Agent Cody Banks (2003) – Intelligence Agent
National Lampoon's Barely Legal a.k.a. After School Special (2003) – Russ
Arbor Vitae (2003) – Janitor
Jiminy Glick in Lalawood (2004) – Bellhop / Barber
The X-Files: I Want to Believe (2008) – Gaunt Man
Poe: Last Days of the Raven (2008) – Joseph Snodgrass
Frankie & Alice (2010) – Hal
Locked in a Garage Band (2012) – Mr. Kaminski
Eadweard (2015) – Press Photographer Phil

Television

Huckleberry Finn and His Friends (1980) – Indian Joe
The Glitter Dome (1984) – Weasel
Love Is Never Silent (1985) – Funeral Director
Perry Mason The Case of the Notorious Nun (1986)
A Masterpiece of Murder (1986)
After the Promise (1987) – Foreman
The Red Spider (1988) – Harold
Dirty Work (1992) – Peter
Mortal Sins (1992) – Brother Anthony
The X-Files (1995-1996, 2016, 2018) – Manager / Dr. Fingers / Tarot Dealer / Curator / The Devil or Alien bartender
The Outer Limits (1995–2002, various episodes) – Nicholas Prentice / Shopkeeper / Moses Saxon / Mr. Wilkes / Father Claridge / Quasga / Minister
Johnny's Girl (1995) – Joe Gimble
Dead Man's Gun (1997) – Crandall (segment "Fool's Gold")
Intensity (1997) – Mr. John Q. Citizen
Millennium (1997, 1998) – Greb / Dr. Ephraim Fabricant
Stargate SG-1(Episode 6.20: "Memento") (2003) – Tarek Solamon
Da Vinci's Inquest (1998–2005) – Chick Savoy
Andromeda (2000–2005) – Höhne
Earthsea (2004) – Thorvald
Intelligence (2005) – Boat Mechanic
Da Vinci's City Hall (2005–2006) – Det. Chick Savoy
Alice (2009) – Rat Catcher
Tower Prep (2010)
The Boy Who Cried Werewolf (2010) – Igor Van Helman Stanisklavsky
Supernatural (2006, 2012, in 1x12: Faith, 8x02: What's Up Tiger Mommy?) – Mr. Vili / The Reaper
Garage Sale Mystery (2013) – Funeral Director
Motive (2014, in 2x6: Bad Blonde) – Alex
Intruders (2014, in 1x2: And Here... You Must Listen, 1x5: The Shepherds and the Fox) – Marcus Fox
The P. I. Experiment (2015) – Bill 'The One Armed Man'
Beyond (2017) – Arthur

References

External links
 

1946 births
Canadian male film actors
Canadian male television actors
Male actors from Alberta
Living people
People from the Municipal District of Spirit River No. 133
University of Alberta alumni